The Kilgore Gushers were a Minor League Baseball team that played in the East Texas League in 1931. The team was the first known professional team to be based in Kilgore, Texas. It was managed by Turkey Gross.

References

Baseball teams established in 1931
Defunct minor league baseball teams
Defunct baseball teams in Texas
Baseball teams disestablished in 1931